Dollhouse is the debut extended play by American singer-songwriter Melanie Martinez, released May 19, 2014, by Atlantic Records and Warner/Chappell. The EP was primarily produced and co-written by hip hop duo Kinetics & One Love. Dollhouse peaked at number four on the Billboard Heatseekers Albums chart.

Background
On April 7, 2014, it was reported by Marketwired that Martinez had signed to Atlantic Records. It was also announced that Martinez would release her debut extended play on May 19, 2014, and would go on a tour promoting the EP beginning on June 4, 2014.

Chart performance 
Dollhouse spent 13 weeks on the Billboard Heatseekers Albums chart, where it peaked at number four on June 7, 2014.

Track listing

Album chart usages for BillboardHeatseekers

Tour 

The Dollhouse Tour was the first tour by American singer-songwriter Melanie Martinez, consisting of three legs. The tour began on June 5, 2014 in Philadelphia and concluded on March 13, 2015 in Pittsburgh.

Notes

References 

2014 debut EPs
Melanie Martinez (singer) albums